Bishop Latimer Memorial Church, Winson Green is a Grade II* listed parish church in the Church of England in Winson Green, Birmingham.

History
The funding for the church was anonymous. It was designed by the architect William Bidlake in the Gothic style and consecrated in 1904.

The parish was assigned out of St Cuthbert’s Church, Winson Green and St Chrysostom’s Church, Hockley in 1904.

There was a major restoration in 1938.

Bells
The eight bells installed in 1958 were of 1776 by Robert Wells, and were formerly in St John's Church, Deritend. They were moved to St John’s Church, Perry Barr in 1972.

Parish status
The church is now known as Bishop Latimer United Church and is in a local ecumenical partnership between the Anglican Church and the United Reformed Church in Winson Green.

Organ
The church has a two manual pipe organ dating by James Jepson Binns. A specification of the organ can be found on the National Pipe Organ Register.

References

Church of England church buildings in Birmingham, West Midlands
Grade II* listed churches in the West Midlands (county)
William Bidlake buildings
Churches completed in 1904
20th-century Church of England church buildings
Grade II listed buildings in Birmingham